Deep Creek is a stream in Georgia, and is a tributary of the Soque River.

Course

Deep Creek rises in northern Habersham County, Georgia, south of Lake Rabun and less than 2 miles southeast of Shoal Creek, and runs in a southeasterly direction for approximately 1.7 miles, then forms the southwestern edge of The Orchard Golf and Country Club, where it feeds two small reservoirs. Deep Creek turns south for approximately 2.3 miles, picks up Roberts Branch, and then makes an abrupt turn to the west as it is joined by Fry Branch. The creek heads west for just under 1 mile, then turns sharply south-southwest at its meeting with Liberty Creek, and flows west of Hollywodd for 3.3 miles to its meeting with Glade Creek, which comes from east of U.S. Route 23. Deep Creek then flows into the Soque River just north of State Route 385, at the border of the Upper Soque, Middle Soque, and Deep Creek sub-watersheds.

Sub-watershed details
The creek watershed and associated waters is designated by the United States Geological Survey as sub-watershed HUC 031300010203, is named the Deep Creek sub-watershed, and drains an area of approximately 30 square miles northeast of Clarkesville, and east of the Soque River.

See also
 Water Resource Region
 South Atlantic-Gulf Water Resource Region
 Apalachicola basin

External links
 The Orchard Golf and Country Club
Soque River Watershed Association

References 

Rivers of Georgia (U.S. state)
Rivers of Habersham County, Georgia